Stephen Lawrence Winwood (born 12 May 1948) is an English musician, singer and songwriter whose genres include blue-eyed soul, rhythm and blues, blues rock and pop rock. Though primarily a guitarist, keyboard player and vocalist prominent for his distinctive, soulful high tenor voice, Winwood plays other instruments proficiently, including drums, mandolin, bass and saxophone.

Winwood was an integral member of three groups of the 1960s and 1970s: the Spencer Davis Group, Traffic and Blind Faith. Beginning in the 1980s, his solo career flourished and he had a number of hit singles, including "While You See a Chance" (1980) from the album Arc of a Diver and "Valerie" (1982) from Talking Back to the Night ("Valerie" became a hit when it was re-released with a remix from Winwood's 1987 compilation album Chronicles). His 1986 album Back in the High Life marked his career zenith, with hit singles including "Back in the High Life Again", "The Finer Things" and the US Billboard Hot 100 number one hit "Higher Love". He found the top of the Hot 100 again with "Roll With It" (1988) from the album of the same name, with "Holding On" also charting highly the same year. While his hit singles ceased at the end of the 1980s, he continued to release new albums up to 2008, when Nine Lives, his latest album, was released.

Winwood was inducted into the Rock and Roll Hall of Fame as a member of Traffic in 2004. In 2005, Winwood was honoured as a BMI Icon at the annual BMI London Awards for his "enduring influence on generations of music makers." In 2008, Rolling Stone ranked Winwood No. 33 in its 100 Greatest Singers of All Time. Winwood has won two Grammy Awards. He was nominated twice for a Brit Award for Best British Male Artist: 1988 and 1989. In 2011, he received the Ivor Novello Award from the British Academy of Songwriters, Composers and Authors for Outstanding Song Collection.

Early life
Winwood was born on 12 May 1948 in Handsworth, Birmingham. His father Lawrence, a foundryman by trade, was a semi-professional musician, playing mainly the saxophone and clarinet. The 4-year-old began playing piano while interested in swing and Dixieland jazz, and soon started playing drums and guitar. He was also a choirboy at St. John's Church of England, Perry Barr. The family moved from Handsworth to Kingstanding (Atlantic Road) Birmingham, where Winwood attended the Great Barr School, one of the first comprehensive schools. He also attended the Birmingham and Midland Institute of Music to develop his skills as a pianist, but did not complete his course.  During this time, he befriended future Fleetwood Mac member Christine McVie.

At eight years old, he first performed with his father and elder brother Muff in the Ron Atkinson Band. Muff later recalled that when Steve began playing regularly with them in licensed pubs and clubs, the piano had to be turned with its back to the audience to try to hide him, because he was so obviously underage.

Career

Early years

While still a pupil at Great Barr School, Winwood was a part of the Birmingham blues rock scene, playing the Hammond C-3 organ and guitar, backing blues and rock legends such as Muddy Waters, John Lee Hooker, Howlin' Wolf, B.B. King, Chuck Berry, and Bo Diddley on their United Kingdom tours, the custom at that time being for US singers to travel solo and be backed by pick-up bands. At this time, Winwood was living on Atlantic Road in Great Barr, close to the Birmingham music halls where he played. Winwood modelled his singing after Ray Charles.

The Spencer Davis Group 
At age 14, Winwood (then known as "Stevie" Winwood) joined the Spencer Davis Group along with older brother Muff, who later had success as a record producer, after Davis saw them performing as the Muffy Wood Jazz Band at a Birmingham pub called the Golden Eagle. The group made their debut at the Eagle and subsequently had a Monday-night residency there. Winwood's distinctive high tenor singing voice and vocal style drew comparisons to Ray Charles.

In 1964, they signed their first recording contract with Island Records. Producer and founder Chris Blackwell later said of Winwood, "He was really the cornerstone of Island Records. He's a musical genius and because he was with Island all the other talent really wanted to be with Island." The group's first record, a single, was released 10 days after Winwood's 16th birthday. The group had their first number one single at the end of 1965, with "Keep on Running"; the money from this success allowed Winwood to buy his own Hammond organ. Winwood co-wrote and recorded the chart-topping hits "Gimme Some Lovin'" and "I'm a Man" before leaving the Spencer Davis Group in 1967.

Eric Clapton and Powerhouse
Winwood joined forces with guitarist Eric Clapton as part of the one-off group Eric Clapton and the Powerhouse. Songs were recorded for the Elektra label, but only three tracks made the 1966 compilation album, What's Shakin'.

Traffic, Blind Faith, and Ginger Baker's Air Force

Winwood met drummer Jim Capaldi, guitarist Dave Mason, and multi-instrumentalist Chris Wood when they jammed together at The Elbow Room, a club in Aston, Birmingham. After Winwood left the Spencer Davis Group in April 1967, the quartet formed Traffic. Soon thereafter, they rented a cottage near the rural village of Aston Tirrold, Berkshire (now Oxfordshire), to write and rehearse new music. This allowed them to escape the city and develop their music.

Early in Traffic's formation, Winwood and Capaldi formed a songwriting partnership, with Winwood writing music to match Capaldi's lyrics. This partnership was the source of most of Traffic's material, including popular songs such as "Paper Sun" and "The Low Spark of High-Heeled Boys", and outlived the band, producing several songs for Winwood and Capaldi's solo albums. Over the band's history, Winwood performed the majority of their lead vocals, keyboard instruments, and guitars. He also frequently played bass and percussion, up to and including the recording sessions for their fourth album. While still in Traffic, Winwood was brought in by Jimi Hendrix to play organ for "Voodoo Chile" on the Electric Ladyland album.

Winwood formed the supergroup Blind Faith in 1969, with Eric Clapton, Ginger Baker, and Ric Grech. The band was short-lived, owing to Clapton's greater interest in Blind Faith's opening act Delaney & Bonnie & Friends; Clapton left the band at the tour's end. Baker, Winwood, and Grech stayed together to form Ginger Baker's Air Force. The line-up consisted of 3/4 of Blind Faith (without Clapton, who was replaced by Denny Laine), half of Traffic (Winwood and Chris Wood, minus Capaldi and Mason), plus musicians who interacted with Baker in his early days, including Phil Seamen, Harold McNair, John Blood, and Graham Bond.

This project also turned out to be short-lived. Winwood soon went into the studio to begin work on a new solo album, tentatively titled Mad Shadows. However, Winwood ended up calling in Wood and Capaldi to help with session work, which prompted Traffic's comeback album John Barleycorn Must Die in 1970.

In 1972, Winwood recorded the part of Captain Walker in the highly successful orchestral version of The Who's Tommy. He recorded a 1973 album with Remi Kabaka and Abdul Lasisi Amao, as Third World, Aiye-Keta. Later, after the reggae group Third World had formed, the album was re-released and identified as being just by the band members' names. In 1976, Winwood provided vocals and keyboards on Go, a concept album by Japanese composer Stomu Yamashta. In 1976, Winwood also played guitar on the Fania All Stars' Delicate and Jumpy record and performed as a guest with the band in their only UK appearance, a sold-out concert at the Lyceum Theatre, London.

Solo career
Weariness with the grind of touring and recording prompted Winwood to leave Traffic and retire to sessioning for some years. Under pressure from Island Records, he resurfaced with his self-titled first solo album in 1977. This was followed by his 1980 hit Arc of a Diver (which included his first solo hit, "While You See a Chance") and Talking Back to the Night in 1982.

Both albums were recorded at his home in Gloucestershire with Winwood playing all instruments. He continued to do sessions during this period, and in 1983, he co-produced and played on Jim Capaldi's top 40 hit "That's Love" and co-wrote the Will Powers top 20 hit "Kissing with Confidence".

In 1986, he travelled to New York City for his next album project. There he enlisted the help of a coterie of stars to record Back in the High Life in the US, and the album was a hit. He topped the Billboard Hot 100 with "Higher Love" and earned two Grammy Awards: Record of the Year and Best Male Pop Vocal Performance. He embarked on an extensive tour of North America in support of the album, and at the end of the tour, he divorced Nicole Weir in England then settled in the Nashville area with his new American wife, Eugenia Crafton.

All these albums were released on Island Records. However, at the peak of his commercial success, Winwood moved to Virgin Records and released Roll with It and Refugees of the Heart. The album Roll with It and the title track hit No. 1 on the US album and singles charts in the summer of 1988. Another album with Virgin, Far from Home, was officially credited to Traffic, but nearly all the instruments were played by Winwood. Despite lacking a significant hit, it broke the top 40 in both the UK and US.

His final Virgin album Junction Seven also broke the UK top 40.

A new studio album, Nine Lives, was released 29 April 2008 by Wincraft Music through Columbia Records. The album opened at No. 12 on the Billboard 200 album chart, his highest US debut ever.

In 2008, he was awarded an honorary doctorate from the Berklee College of Music to add to his honorary degree from Aston University, Birmingham. On 28 March 2012 Winwood was one of Roger Daltrey's special guest stars for "An Evening with Roger Daltrey and Friends" gig, in aid of the Teenage Cancer Trust at the Royal Albert Hall.

In 2013, Winwood toured North America with Rod Stewart as part of the "Live the Life" tour. In 2014, Winwood toured North America with Tom Petty & The Heartbreakers.

In January 2020, a North American summer tour was announced with Steely Dan.

On 17 February 2020, Winwood participated in "A Tribute to Ginger Baker", which took place at Eventim Apollo Hammersmith in London. Other participants were Ron Wood, Roger Waters, and Eric Clapton. The concert was held in honour of Ginger Baker, his former band member in Blind Faith, who had died the previous year.

Group work

In 1994, Capaldi and Winwood reunited Traffic for a new album, Far From Home, and a tour, including a performance at Woodstock '94 Festival. That same year, Winwood appeared on the A Tribute To Curtis Mayfield CD, recording Mayfield's "It's All Right".

In 1995, Winwood released "Reach for the Light" for the animated film Balto. In 1997, Winwood released a new album, Junction Seven, toured the US, and sang with Chaka Khan at the VH-1 Honors.

In 1998, Winwood joined Tito Puente, Arturo Sandoval, Ed Calle, and other musicians to form the band "Latin Crossings" for a European tour, after which they split without making any recordings. Winwood also appeared in the film Blues Brothers 2000, as a member of the Louisiana Gator Boys, appearing on stage with Isaac Hayes, Eric Clapton, and KoKo Taylor at the battle of the bands competition.

In 2003, Winwood released a new studio album, About Time, on his new record label, Wincraft Music. In 2004, Eric Prydz sampled Winwood's 1982 song "Valerie" for the song "Call on Me". After hearing an early version, Winwood not only gave permission to use his song, he re-recorded the samples for Prydz to use. The remix spent five weeks at No. 1 on the UK singles chart.

In 2005, his Soundstage Performances DVD was released, featuring the recent About Time album, with solo hits including "Back in the High Life", and he also performed hits from his early days with Traffic. That same year, he appeared on Grammy Award winner Ashley Cleveland's album Men and Angels Say, a mix of rock, blues, and country arrangements of well-known hymns, including "I Need Thee Every Hour", which featured a vocal duet and organ performance. On her 2006 record Back to Basics, Christina Aguilera featured Winwood (using the piano and organ instrumentation from the John Barleycorn Must Die track "Glad") on her song "Makes Me Wanna Pray".

In May 2007, Winwood performed in support of the Countryside Alliance, an organisation opposed to the Hunting Act 2004, in a concert at Highclere Castle, joining fellow rock artists Bryan Ferry, Eric Clapton, Steve Harley, and Kenney Jones.

In July 2007, Winwood performed with Clapton in the latter's Crossroads Guitar Festival. Among the songs they played were "Presence of the Lord" and "Can't Find My Way Home" from their Blind Faith days, with Winwood playing several guitar leads during a six-song set. The two continued their collaboration with three sold-out nights at Madison Square Garden in New York City in February 2008.

On 19 February 2008, Winwood and Clapton released a collaborative EP through iTunes titled Dirty City. Clapton and Winwood released a CD and DVD of their Madison Square Garden shows and then toured together in the summer of 2009.

Personal life
Between 1978 and 1986, Winwood was married to Nicole Weir (d. 2005), who had contributed background vocals to some of his early solo work. The two married at Cheltenham Register Office.

Winwood's primary residence is a 300-year-old manor house in the Cotswolds, England, where he also has a recording studio. Winwood also has a home in Nashville, Tennessee, with his wife, Eugenia Crafton, a Trenton, Tennessee native whom he married in 1987. They have four children. Both were patrons of the Cheltenham Festivals of music and literature between 2007 and 2015.

Winwood's eldest daughter, Mary Clare, in 2011 wedded businessman Ben Elliot, who later became the Co-Chairman of the Conservative Party. The couple have two sons. Winwood's daughter Lilly Winwood is a singer; she was featured with him performing a duet of his song "Higher Love" in a Hershey commercial. She was the opening act and sang backup on multiple songs during her father's 2018 Greatest Hits Live tour.

Discography

Solo

1977: Steve Winwood
1980: Arc of a Diver
1982: Talking Back to the Night
1986: Back in the High Life
1988: Roll with It
1990: Refugees of the Heart
1997: Junction Seven
2003: About Time
2008: Nine Lives
2017: Greatest Hits Live

Spencer Davis Group
Their First LP (1965)
The Second Album (1966)
Autumn '66 (1966)

Traffic
see Traffic discography

Blind Faith
1969: Blind Faith

Ginger Baker's Air Force
1970: Ginger Baker's Air Force

Third World
1973: Aiye-Keta

Go
1976: Go
1976: Go Live from Paris

Eric Clapton/Steve Winwood 
2009: Live from Madison Square Garden

Session work
 The Jimi Hendrix Experience – Electric Ladyland, 1968
 Joe Cocker – "With a Little Help from My Friends", 1968
 BB King – B.B. King in London, 1971
 McDonald and Giles – McDonald and Giles, 1971 - organ, and piano solo on "Turnham Green"
 Jimi Hendrix – The Cry of Love, 1971
 Howlin' Wolf – The London Howlin' Wolf Sessions, 1971 - organ and piano 
 Shawn Phillips – Faces, 1972 – Organ on Parisien Plight II 
 London Symphony Orchestra – Tommy – As Performed by the London Symphony Orchestra & Chamber Choir, 1972
 Jim Capaldi – Oh How We Danced, 1972
 Eddie Harris – E.H. in the U.K. (Atlantic), 1973 With Chris Squire, Alan White and Tony Kaye 
 Lou Reed – Berlin, 1973
 John Martyn – Inside Out, 1973
 Jim Capaldi – Whale Meat Again, 1974
 Robert Palmer – Sneakin' Sally Through the Alley, 1974
 Vivian Stanshall – Men Opening Umbrellas Ahead, 1974
 Jim Capaldi – Short Cut Draw Blood, 1975
 Jade Warrior – Waves, 1975
 Toots & the Maytals – Reggae Got Soul, 1976
 Sandy Denny – Rendezvous, 1977
 John Martyn – One World, 1977
 Pierre Moerlen's Gong – Downwind, 1978
 Vivian Stanshall – Sir Henry at Rawlinson End, 1978
 Jim Capaldi – Daughter of the Night, 1978
 George Harrison – George Harrison, 1979
 Marianne Faithfull – Broken English, 1979
 Jim Capaldi – The Sweet Smell of... Success, 1980
 Jim Capaldi – Let the Thunder Cry, 1981
 Marianne Faithfull – Dangerous Acquaintances, 1981
 Jim Capaldi – Fierce Heart, 1983
 David Gilmour – About Face, 1984
 Christine McVie – Christine McVie, 1984
 Billy Joel – The Bridge, 1986
 Dave Mason – Two Hearts, 1987
 Talk Talk – The Colour of Spring, 1986
 Jim Capaldi – Some Come Running, 1988
 Jimmy Buffett – "My Barracuda", 1988
 Phil Collins – ...But Seriously, 1989
 Soulsister – Heat, 1990
 Davy Spillane – A Place Among The Stones, 1994
 Paul Weller – Stanley Road, 1995
 Kathy Troccoli – Corner of Eden, 1998
 Eric Clapton – Back Home, 2005
 Eric Clapton – Clapton, 2010
 Slash – Hey Joe Rock N' Roll Hall of Fame, 2010
 Miranda Lambert – Four the Record, 2011
 Eric Clapton – Old Sock, 2013
 Gov't Mule – Shout!, 2013

References

External links

 Official website
 Albums that Winwood guested on and/or produced
 Steve Winwood & Eric Clapton live@ Bucharest (review)
 
 

1948 births
British Christians
Living people
English keyboardists
English male singer-songwriters
English male guitarists
English record producers
English rock guitarists
English organists
English songwriters
Columbia Records artists
Island Records artists
Virgin Records artists
Blind Faith members
Ginger Baker's Air Force members
Traffic (band) members
Grammy Award winners
Musicians from Birmingham, West Midlands
British rhythm and blues boom musicians
British soft rock musicians
People from Great Barr
People from Handsworth, West Midlands
People from Aston Tirrold
The Spencer Davis Group members
Eric Clapton and the Powerhouse members